= Ting Shih =

American entrepreneur

Ting Shih is the founder and CEO of ClickMedix, a company that connects healthcare professionals and patients in developing countries with specialist doctors around the world, in order to achieve better healthcare. She is a 2012 laureate of the Cartier Women's Initiative.

== Career & ClickMedix ==
Shih received her MBA from the Massachusetts Institute of Technology Sloan School of Management, and a master's degree in Systems Engineering, also from MIT. While she was a graduate student at MIT, she developed her first company, Click Diagnostics. Said company won the USAID 2.0 Challenge, and the World Health Care Congress Best Telemedicine Award. However, she was unhappy with the scale of the telemedicine system, and left the company to develop what would become ClickMedix. While at MIT, she was challenged with developing a healthcare business that would help a billion people. After receiving this challenge, she developed the idea for ClickMedix. In her words, "In developing countries they have scarce access to healthcare, but they do have mobile phones, and the idea spread from there, and all the way to the developed world too." Thus, Shih decided to utilize cell phones to bring better healthcare to developing countries. The software allows patients and healthcare professionals to communicate with specialists using a mobile phone. One way in which they can communicate is by taking a picture of an injury and sending it to a specialist. ClickMedix was launched in 2011, with the initial aim of Botswanan women be screened for cervical cancer. From Botswana, the technology spread to Ghana, and spread again to 16 countries around the world. As of 2015, ClickMedix has helped over 100,000 patients in India be more effectively screened for ear infections. Hearing loss is a common diagnosis in India, and access to quick diagnosis through ClickMedix has improved the lives of thousands of people. ClickMedix has also helped reduce some patient wait times from months to 72 hours, and has helped physicians serve 15 times the number of patients they would normally be able to serve. ClickMedix also helps healthcare workers, as they are able to learn from the specialists they communicate with, and also communicate methods that they have learned with specialists. Shih hopes to further expand her business, while also looking for ways for remote doctors to be paid for their services more reliably. Her ultimate goal is to have one-click health care.

== Honors & awards ==
In 2012, Shih was honored by the Cartier Women's Initiative Awards. In 2015, she was named a Mother of Invention by Toyota.
